Astrocaryum faranae is a palm native to Amazon Rainforest vegetation in Brazil and Peru. This plant has a commercial value because it has oil seeds which may be used to make cosmetics.

References

faranae
Trees of Brazil
Trees of Peru